Shadow Conspiracy is a 1997 American political thriller film starring Charlie Sheen, Donald Sutherland, Linda Hamilton, and Sam Waterston. It was the final film directed by George P. Cosmatos, who died in 2005. The film was poorly received by critics. It was released on DVD in the United States in November 2003 by Buena Vista Home Entertainment.

Plot

Set in Washington, D.C., this film documents an attempted power grab by White House Chief of Staff Jacob Conrad. Bobby Bishop is a special aide to the President of the United States who finds out about a plot to assassinate the President from a former professor. Bobby's old professor is murdered shortly thereafter and Bobby is left to try to uncover the conspiracy on his own. He recruits his journalist friend Amanda Givens to help him uncover the mystery and stop the assassination.

Cast

Production
Production began in June 1995. Shadow Conspiracy was filmed in 12 weeks, with most of the principal photography taking place in Richmond, Virginia, Georgetown, Washington and Baltimore, Maryland.

Reception
Shadow Conspiracy was panned by critics. On Rotten Tomatoes, the film has a rating of 3% based on reviews from 29 critics, and an average rating of 3.3/10. The site's critics' consensus reads: "Rather than exciting audiences with a thrilling race against time, Shadow Conspiracy suggests there may be a secret cabal duping talented actors into selecting woefully deficient scripts." The film did not fare well at the box office, grossing a little over $2 million domestically.

See also
 The Awakening (buried-giant sculpture featured in the film)

References

External links
 
 
 
 Shadow Conspiracy at MovieWeb

1997 films
1997 thriller films
1990s American films
1990s English-language films
1990s political thriller films
American political thriller films
Cinergi Pictures films
Films about conspiracy theories
Films directed by George P. Cosmatos
Films scored by Bruce Broughton
Films set in Maryland
Films set in Virginia
Films set in Washington, D.C.
Films shot in Baltimore
Films shot in Virginia
Films shot in Washington, D.C.
Hollywood Pictures films